Camosun was the name of a Songhees settlement near the site of the present-day Empress Hotel on Vancouver Island.  Fort Camosun was the second name of what became Fort Victoria. It now refers to:
 Camosun College, a community college in Victoria, British Columbia
 The Camosun Bog in Pacific Spirit Park on the University Endowment Lands at the University of British Columbia adjacent to the City of Vancouver.